Marie-Jean-Léon Lecoq, Baron d'Hervey de Juchereau, Marquis d'Hervey de Saint-Denys (6 May 1822 – 2 November 1892) son of Pierre Marin Alexandre Le Coq or Lecoq, Baron d'Hervey (1780-1858), and Marie Louise Josephine Mélanie Juchereau de Saint-Denys (1789-1844) was born on 6 May 1822. D'Hervey was a French sinologist also known for his research on dreams.

Contributions to Sinology 

Hervey de Saint Denys made an intense study of Chinese, and in 1851 D'Hervey published his Recherches sur l'agriculture et l'horticulture des Chinois (Transl: Research on the agriculture and horticulture of the Chinese), in which he dealt with the plants and animals that potentially might be able to be acclimatized to and introduced in Western countries. He translated as well Chinese texts as some Chinese stories, not of classical interest, but valuable for the light they throw on Chinese culture and customs.
He was a man of letters too. E.g. he translated some Spanish-language works, and wrote a history of the Spanish drama.
D'Hervey also created a literary translation theory, paraphrased by Joshua A. Fogel, the author of a book review on De l'un au multiple: Traductions du chinois vers les langues européenes, as "empowering the translator to use his own creative talents to embellish wherever necessary—not a completely free hand, but some leeway to avoid the pitfall of becoming too leaden."

By adoption by his uncle Amédée Louis Vincent Juchereau (1782-1858) he became Marquis de Saint-Denys.

At the Paris Exhibition of 1867, Hervey de Saint Denys acted as commissioner for the Chinese exhibits. and is decorated by the Legion of Honour.On June the 11th 1868 the Marquis married the 19-year-old Austrian orphan Louise de Ward.

In 1874 he succeeded Stanislas Julien in the chair of Chinese at the Collège de France, while in 1878 he was elected a member of the Académie des Inscriptions et de Belles-Lettres. D'Hervey died in his hotel at Paris on 2 November 1892.

Contributions to Oneirology 

More recently Hervey de Saint Denys has begun to be known for his introspective studies on dreams. D'Hervey was also one of the earliest oneirologists (specialists in the study of dreams), and is nowadays regarded as "The Father" of modern lucid dreaming. In 1867 there appeared as an anonymous publication a book entitled Les rêves et les moyens de les diriger; observations pratiques (Translation: Dreams and the Ways to Direct Them:  Practical Observations). In a footnote on page 1 from the 1878-edition of Alfred Maury's work Le sommeil et les rêves D'Hervey de Saint-Denys was identified as the writer of it. Writers like e.g. Havelock Ellis (1911), Johann Stärcke (1912), A. Breton (1955) a.o. refer to the fact that the original anonymous publication was hard to lay hands on as copies were scarce, because shortly after the publication publisher Amyot went broke. Sigmund Freud (Die Traumdeutung.Wien; Deuticke.1900) e.g. states: "Maury, le sommeil et les rêves, Paris,1878, p.19, polemisiert lebhaft gegen d'Hervey, dessen Schrift ich mir trotz aller Bemühung nicht verschaffen konnte"(Transl.:Maury, Sleep and Dreams, Paris,1878, p. 19, argues strenuously against d'Hervey, whose book I could not lay hands on in spite of all my efforts).

D'Hervey started recording his dreams on a daily basis from the age of 13. (At page 4 of his work Les Rêves et les Moyens de Les Diriger  the author stated that he was in his fourteenth year when he started his dreamwork). In this book, the author proposed a theoretical framework, techniques to control dreams, and he described dreams in which the "dreamer is perfectly aware he is dreaming". Recently the question has been raised who has coined for the very first time the term 'lucid dreaming'. Generally it is contributed to Frederik van Eeden, but some scientists question if this was inspired by the use of the term by Saint-Denys. Denys describes his own lucid dreams with sentences like 'I was aware of my situation'. It is erroneous to state that Denys's book deals mainly with lucid dreams. It does not. Generally it is focused on the development of dreams, not specific on lucid dreams. 
It is only in recent years that Saint-Denys was rediscovered for his oneirology work. In an article from Den Blanken & Meijer, the authors wondered about the fact that there were so little biographical data available on such an erudite person as Saint-Denys was, and presented some.

In 1964 Editor Tchou reprinted Les Rêves Et Les Moyens de Les Diriger, but the 1867-Appendix, entitled 'Un rêve apres avoir pris du hatchich' (Transl.: A dream after I took hashish) had, due to its contents, been left out, without indication. In 1982 an abbreviated English edition appeared, which was based on the Tchou-edition, and consequently it did not contain the Appendix either, nor did it refer to it. The Den Blanken & Meijer-article revealed this fact, and the authors presented for the first time an English translation of this Appendix. Others were stimulated by above, and in 1992 the French Dream Society 'Oniros' held in Paris a commemoration on Saint-Denys. Leading dream specialists Carolus den Blanken, Celia Green, Paul Tholey (1937-1998) and Oniros president-elect Roger Ripert paid their respect. In 1995 society Oniros published an integral French version of Denys' book on dreams, and Italian, Dutch and Japanese translations appeared. Recently several French editions of Les Rêves has been published. It is not always evident if these (E)books are
integral versions or based on the 1964-Tchou edition. 
In 2016 an integral English version (inclusive the original frontpage, backcover and frontispice) appeared as a free of charge E-book with the title:'Dreams and the Ways to Direct Them: Practical Observations', edited by Drs. Carolus den Blanken & Drs. Eli Meijer. In this translation, the designer of the front cover of the 1867-original is revealed, namely Henri Alfred Darjou (1832-1875), French painter and draughtsman. This edition was not without flaws, and in 2020 appeared an enhanced version.

Bibliography

Sinology 

 Hervey de Saint-Denys (1850). Recherches sur l'agriculture et l'horticulture des Chinois et sur les végétaux, les animaux et les procédés agricoles que l'on pourrait introduire... dans l'Europe occidentale et le nord de l'Afrique. (Studies on the agriculture and horticulture of the Chinese). Allouard et Kaeppelin. Paris.text on line
 Hervey de Saint-Denys (1859). La Chine devant l’Europe. Amyot/Paris.text on line
 Hervey de Saint-Denys (1862). Poésies de l'époque des T'ang. Étude sur l’art poétique en Chine (Poems of the Tang Dynasty). Paris: Amyot.
 Hervey de Saint-Denys (1869). Recueil de textes faciles et gradués en chinois moderne, avec un tableau des 214 clefs chinoises et un vocabulaire de tous les mots compris dans les exercices, publié à l'usage des élèves de l'École spéciale des langues orientales.
 Hervey de Saint-Denys (1870). Le Li-sao, poéme du IIIe siècle avant notre ére, traduit du chinois (The Li Sao, a poem of the 3rd century BC, translated from Chinese). Paris: Maisonneuve.
 Hervey de Saint-Denys (1872). Mémoire sur l'histoire ancienne du Japon d'après le Ouen Hien Tong Kao de Ma-Touan-Lin. Imprimerie Nationale. Paris.Text on line
 Hervey de Saint-Denys (1873). Mémoire sur l'ethnographie de la Chine centrale et méridionale, d'après un ensemble de documents inédits tirés des anciens écrivains chinois. In-8°, paginé 109–134. Extrait des "Mémoires de la Société d'ethnographie". XII. text on line
 Hervey de Saint-Denys (1873-1880). Ban Zai Sau, pour servir à la connaissance de l'Extrême-Orient, 4 vol.
 Hervey de Saint-Denys (1875). Sur le pays connu des anciens Chinois sous le nom de Fou-sang, et de quelques documents inédits pouvant servir à l'identifier. Comptes rendus des séances de l'Académie des Inscriptions et Belles-Lettres, Vol. 19, Issue 4, pages 319–335. Text on line
 Hervey de Saint-Denys (1876). Mémoire sur le pays connu sous le nom de Fou-Sang.
 Hervey de Saint-Denys (1876–1883). Ethnographie des peuples étrangers de la Chine (Ethnography of people abroad in China), translated from Ma Duanlin.H. Georg, 2 Vol.4. Paris. - London H. Georg. - E. Leroux. - Trübner. text on line
 Hervey de Saint-Denys (1879). Sur une notice de M. August Strindberg concernant les relations de la Suède avec la Chine et les pays tartares, depuis le milieu du XVIIe siècle jusqu'à nos jours. Comptes rendus des séances de l'Académie des Inscriptions et Belles-Lettres, Vol  23, Issue 2, pages 137–140.
 Hervey de Saint-Denys (1885). Trois nouvelles chinoises. Translation of selections from Jingu qiguan 今古奇觀.Ernest Leroux éditeur, « Bibliothèque Orientale Elzévirienne », vol. XLV, Paris. Text on line
 Hervey de Saint-Denys (1886). L’Annam et la Cochinchine. Imprimerie Nationale. Paris. 
 Hervey de Saint-Denys (1887). Mémoires sur les doctrines religieuses; de Confucius et de l'école des lettres (Dissertations on religious doctrines; from Confucius to the school of letters).
 Hervey de Saint-Denys (1889). La tunique de perles. Une serviteur méritant et Tant le Kiaï-Youen, trois nouvelles chinoises. E. Dentu, Paris. Reprint in Six nouvelles chinoises, Éditions Bleu de Chine, Paris, 1999.
 Hervey de Saint-Denys (1892). Six nouvelles nouvelles, traduites pour la première fois du chinois par le Marquis d’Hervey-Saint-Denys. Éditions J. Maisonneuve, Collection Les Littératures Populaires, t. XXX, Paris. Reprint in Six nouvelles chinoises, Éditions Bleu de Chine, Paris, 1999.
 Hervey de Saint-Denys (2004). Écoutez là-bas, sous les rayons de la lune, traduzione di Li Bai e note del marchese d'Hervey Saint-Denis, Redaction Céline Pillon.

Oneirology 

 Hervey de Saint-Denys (1867). Les Rêves et les moyens de les diriger; Observations pratiques. (Transl.: Dream and the Ways to Direct Them: Practical Observations). Paris: Librairie d'Amyot, Éditeur, 8, Rue de la Paix.(Originally published anonymous). Text on line
 Henri Cordier (1892). Necrologie: Le Marquis d'Hervey Saint Denys . T'oung Pao- International Journal of Chinese Studies. Vol. 3 No. 5, pag. 517–520. Publisher E.J. Brill/Leiden/The Netherlands.Text on line
 Alexandre Bertrand (1892). Annonce du décès de M. le marquis Léon d'Hervey de Saint-Denys, membre de l'Académie.(Transl.: Announcement of the death of Marquis d'Hervey de Saint-Denys, member of the Academie). Comptes rendus des séances de l'Académie des Inscriptions et Belles-Lettres, Vol. 36, Issue 6, page 377.Text on line
 Alexandre Bertrand (1892). Paroles prononcées par le Président de l'Académie à l'occasion de la mort de M. le marquis d'Hervey-Saint-Denys. (Transl.: Words spoken by the president of the Academy on the occasion of the death of marquis d'Hervey de Saint-Denys). Comptes rendus des séances de l'Académie des Inscriptions et Belles-Lettres, Vol. 36, Issue 6, pages 392–397. Text on line
 Hervey de Saint-Denys (1964). Les Rêves et les moyens de les diriger. Paris: Tchou/Bibliothèque du Merveilleux.Preface by Robert Desoille.  Edited by Jacques Donnars. This edition does not contain 'The Appendix' from the 1867-book. Text on line
 B. Schwartz (1972). Hervey de Saint-Denys: Sa vie, ses recherches et ses découvertes sur le sommeil et les reves. Hommage à l'occasion du 150e anniversaire de sa naissance (Transl.: Hervey de Saint-Denys: His life, his investigations and his discoveries about the sleep and the dreams. Tribute on the 150th anniversary of his birth). Revue d'Electroencéphalographie et de Neurophysiologie Clinique, Vol 2, Issue 2, April–June 1972, pages 131–139.
 Hervey de Saint-Denys (1977). Les Rêves et les moyens de les diriger. Plan de la Tour: Editions d'Aujourd'hui.(Facsimile reprint of the Tchou-Edition).
 Hervey de Saint-Denys (1982). Dreams and how to guide them. Translated by N.Fry and edited by Morton Schatzman. London. Gerald Duckworth. . (abbreviated version) 
 C.M. den Blanken & E.J.G. Meijer (1988/1991). An Historical View of "Dreams and the Ways to Direct Them; Practical Observations" by Marie-Jean-Léon LeCoq, le Marquis d'Hervey-Saint-Denys. Lucidity Letter, December, 1988, Vol.7, No.2, p. 67-78. Revised Edition:Lucidity,1991, Vol.10 No.1&2, p. 311-322. This article contains an English translation of the forgotten Appendix from the 1867-book.
 Hervey de Saint-Denys (1991). Les Reves et les Moyens de les Diriger. Editor D'Aujourd'hui. . No illustrations.
 B. Schwartz (1992). Ce qu'on a du savoir, cru savoir, pu savoir sur la vie du marquis d'Hervey de Saint-Denys.(Transl.: What was supposed to be known and what was believed to be known). Oniros no. 37/38, pag. 4–8. Soc. Oniros/Paris.
 R. Ripert (1992). Découverte et réhabilitation d'Hervey de Saint-Denys.(Transl.: The discovery and rehabilitation of d'Hervey de Saint-Denys). Oniros no.37/38 pag. 20–21. Soc. Oniros/Paris.
 Hervey de Saint-Denys (1995). Les Reves et Les Moyens de Les Diriger:Observations Pratiques. . Soc.Oniros/Paris.
 O. de Luppé, A. Pino, R. Ripert & B. Schwartz (1995).   (Transl.: D'Hervey de Saint-Denys 1822-1892; Biography, Family correspondence, oneirological and sinological works; Tributes to the author on the centenary of his death and artistic exposition regarding his dreams) Oniros, BP 30, 93451 Ile Saint-Denis cedex. The tributes are by Carolus den Blanken, Celia Green, Roger Ripert and Paul Tholey. 
 Hervey de Saint-Denys (2000). I sogni e il modo di dirigerli. (Transl.: The dream and the way to direct it). Translation by C.M. Carbone, Il Minotauro, Phoenix. .
 Hervey de Saint-Denys (2013). Dromen: Praktische Observaties. (Transl.: Dreams: Practical Observations - Integral Dutch Translation of Les Rêves et les moyens de les diriger: Observations Pratiques)(E-book) . Editor and Translator Drs. Carolus M. den Blanken.
 Hervey de Saint-Denys (2007).  Les Rêves et les moyens de les diriger. No illustrations.  Broché. Editions Cartouche/Paris. Also in E-book format.
 Hervey de Saint-Denys, Marie Jean Leon (2008). Les Reves et les Moyens de les diriger. No illustrations. No Appendix. . Paperback, Buenos Books International/Paris.
 Hervey de Saint-Denys, Marie Jean Leon (2012). Yume no sojuho. . Editor Takashi Tachiki. Publ. Kokushokankokai/Tokyo;2012. 
 Jacqueline Carroy (2013), La force et la couleur des rêves selon Hervey de Saint-Denys , Rives méditerranéennes, 44 | 2013, 53–68. 
 Hervey de Saint-Denys, Marie Jean Leon (2013). Les Reves et les Moyens de les diriger. No illustrations. No Appendix.  E-Pub Edition, Buenos Books America LLC. .
 Hervey de Saint-Denys (2016). Dreams and the Ways to Direct Them: Practical Observations. Published by Carolus den Blanken/Utrecht(E-book) . Editors: Drs. Carolus den Blanken and Drs. Eli Meijer. English Translator: Drs. Carolus den Blanken. Translator Greek & Latin Sentences: Prof. Dr. Jan van Gijn. Integral Edition.
 Hervey de Saint-Denys (2020). Dreams and the Ways to Direct Them: Practical Observations, Including an appendix with a record of a dream after taking hashish. Inner Garden Press/Utrecht(E-book) . Editor: Derekh Moreh. (Enhanced edition of the Den Blanken translation)
 Hervey de Saint-Denys (2021). Dreams and how to direct them: Practical Observations. Ouroboros Publishing (paperback) . Editor: Ouroboros Publishing. Translator: D. Bernardo.
Hervey de Saint-Denys (2021). Los sueños y como dirigirlos: Observaciones prácticas. Published by Abraxas Editores. Editor: Abraxas Editores. Translator: D. Bernardo.

References

Further reading

 genealogy on geneanet pierfit (after log in)
 Hervey de Saint-Denys (1849). Insurrection de Naples en 1647. Amyot. Paris. Text on line
 Hervey de Saint-Denys (1856). Histoire de la révolution dans les Deux-Siciles depuis 1793.
 Hervey de Saint-Denys (1875). Examen des faits mensongers contenus dans un libelle publié sous le faux nom de Léon Bertin avec le jugement du tribunal correctionel de Versailles.
 Hervey de Saint-Denys (1878-1889). Collection of 6 autograph letters signed to unknown recipients. Chateau du Breau, (Seine-et-Marne), and 9 Av. Bosquet, 24 June 1878- 9 June 1889. In French. The letters are written to colleagues and friends and mainly concern sinological matters.
 Truchelut & Valkman (1884). Marie Jean Léon d'Hervey de Saint-Denys. Bibliothèque nationale de France, Département Société de Géographie, SG PORTRAIT-1182. 1 photogr. + notice et letters. Text on line
 Pino, Angel and Rabut, Isabelle (1999). "Le marquis d'Hervey-Saint-Denys et les traductions littéraires: À propos d'un texte traduit par lui et retraduit par d'autres." (Archive), English title: "The marquis D’Hervey-Saint-Denys and literary translations", In: Alleton, Vivianne and Michael Lackner (editors). De l'un au multiple: traductions du chinois vers les langues européennes Translations from Chinese into European Languages. Fondation Maison des sciences de l'homme, Paris, p. 114-142. . English abstract available
 Léon d’Hervey de Saint-Denys (1822-O1878-1892). Entre science et rêve, un patrimoine révélé. Journée du Patrimoine, 16 septembre 2012.Text on line 
 Jacqueline Carroy (2013). La force et la couleur des rêves selon Hervey de Saint-Denys. Rives Méditerranéennes, 44, p. 53-68. Référence électronique (2013). Rives Méditerranéennes 44. Text on line

1823 births
1892 deaths
French orientalists
French sinologists
Sleep researchers
Oneirologists
Lucid dreams
Translators from Chinese
Translators to French
Spanish–French translators
Members of the Académie des Inscriptions et Belles-Lettres
19th-century translators
Academic staff of the Collège de France